Pennant is a small village in Powys, mid Wales located on the B4518 road between Llanbrynmair and Llanidloes.

Villages in Powys